The Xingu languages (also known as Tupi–Guarani V) are a subgroup of the Tupi–Guarani language family.

Languages
The Xingu languages are:

Anambé (of Cairarí)
Amanayé
Xingú Asuriní
Araweté
Aurá
Ararandewara

References